Ernest Alexander Burke (June 26, 1924 – January 31, 2004)  was an American baseball player in the Negro leagues.

Burke was born in Havre de Grace, Maryland. During World War II, he enlisted in the United States Marine Corps, and was one of the first black U.S. Marines to serve in World War II, earning a medal as a sharpshooter. During his tour of duty in the Pacific, Burke began to play baseball.

After the war, he became a pitcher and outfielder for the Baltimore Elite Giants in the Negro American League. He played for Baltimore from 1946 to 1949. In 1949, he joined the Pough-Kingston team in the Western League, then later played in the Canadian Provincial League.

Burke died of kidney cancer complications at the age of 79. A statue of Burke was unveiled on June 26, 2021 in his home city.

References

External links
 and Baseball-Reference Black Baseball stats and Seamheads
 
 Havard de Grace Official City Website

1924 births
2004 deaths
Baseball players from Maryland
Baltimore Elite Giants players
Deaths from kidney cancer
People from Havre de Grace, Maryland
African Americans in World War II
United States Marine Corps personnel of World War II
Deaths from cancer in Maryland
United States Marines
Baseball pitchers
21st-century African-American people